Wilson Messer (August 23, 1876 – September 9, 1958) was an American farmer, businessman, and politician from New York.

Life 
Messer was born on August 23, 1876 in Campbell, New York, the son of Thomas Messer and Martha White.

Messer attended the Painted Post High School in Campbell, after which he studied civil engineering for two years. Until 1920, he largely worked as a farmer on land his family owned for a century. He spent six years teaching in school and two years doing ranch work and prospecting on the Pacific Coast. He then moved to Corning and worked in the automobile business for five years. After that, he entered the real estate business.

Messer was a general clerk in the New York State Assembly in 1917, a committee clerk in 1918, and a deputy clerk in 1919, and 1920. In 1923, he was elected to the Assembly as a Republican, representing the Steuben County 1st District. He served in the Assembly in 1924, 1925, 1926, 1927, 1928, 1929, 1930, 1931, 1932, 1933, 1934, 1935, and 1936.

Messer was a member of the State Aviation Commission since it was first organized. He was on the Republican County Committee for 25 years. He was a member of the Elks, the Freemasons, and the Rotary Club. He attended the First Baptist Church of Corning. In 1920, he married Maude B. Woodcock of Campbell. They had a daughter, Majorie.

Messer died in Corning Hospital on September 9, 1958. He was buried in Coopers Plains Cemetery.

References

External links 

 The Political Graveyard

1876 births
1958 deaths
Politicians from Corning, New York
Farmers from New York (state)
20th-century American businesspeople
Businesspeople from New York (state)
American real estate businesspeople
20th-century American politicians
Republican Party members of the New York State Assembly
American Freemasons
Baptists from New York (state)
Burials in New York (state)